Zhao Zihan (born 4 September 1993) is a Chinese water polo player.

She was part of the Chinese team at the  2015 World Aquatics Championships, and the 2016 Summer Olympics.

See also
 China at the 2015 World Aquatics Championships

References

External links
http://www.todor66.com/Water_Polo/World/Women_2015.html
http://archives.fina.org/H2O/index.php?option=com_content&view=category&layout=blog&id=49&Itemid=315&limitstart=40
http://www.gettyimages.com/pictures/zhao-zihan-13601883#zihan-zhao-of-china-shoots-as-rita-keszthelyi-of-hungary-tries-to-picture-id587628358

Chinese female water polo players
Living people
Place of birth missing (living people)
1993 births
Asian Games medalists in water polo
Water polo players at the 2014 Asian Games
Asian Games gold medalists for China
Medalists at the 2014 Asian Games
21st-century Chinese women